Ideas Above Our Station is the first studio album by the English alternative rock band, Hundred Reasons, released on 20 May 2002 on Columbia Records. The album reached number 6 in the UK Albums Chart and is the band's most commercially successful album to date.

In 2012, the band got together after a three-year break to celebrate the album's ten-year anniversary.

Artwork
The album cover art is a stylised photograph of the Lloyd's Building in London.

Track listing
 "I'll Find You"
 "Answers"
 "Dissolve"
 "What Thought Did"
 "If I Could"
 "Falter"
 "Shine"
 "Drowning"
 "Oratorio"
 "Silver"
 "Gone Too Far"
 "Avalanche"
 "Remmus" (Bonus Track)
 "No.5" (Bonus Track)

Personnel
Andy Bews - drums
Colin Doran - lead vocals, keyboard
Andy Gilmour - bass guitar
Larry Hibbitt - guitar, vocals, lead vocals (chorus of "Shine")
Paul Townsend - guitar, vocals, lead vocals (verses of "Silver")
Dave Sardy - producer
Greg Fidelman - engineering
Greg Gordon - editing, additional engineering
Juan Garcia - second engineer
Peter - second engineer
Jennifer Paola - production coordinator
Stephen Marcussen - mastering
Stewart Whitmore - digital editing
Steve Gullick - photography
Dave Goodchild - photography
Mark Unwin / Precession Industries - design, illustration

Charts

Singles

Certifications

References

2002 albums
Hundred Reasons albums
Columbia Records albums
Albums produced by Dave Sardy